Thomas Wilson Dorr (November 5, 1805December 27, 1854), was an American politician and reformer in Rhode Island, best known for leading the Dorr Rebellion.

Early life, family, and education
Thomas Wilson Dorr was born in Providence, Rhode Island, the son of Sullivan and Lydia (Allen) Dorr. His father was a prosperous manufacturer and co-owner of Bernon Mill Village. Dorr's family occupied a good social position. He had sisters and other siblings.

As a boy, he attended Phillips Exeter Academy. After graduating from Harvard College in 1823, he went to New York City, where he studied law under Chancellor James Kent and Vice-Chancellor William McCoun. He was admitted to the bar in 1827 and returned to Providence to practice.

Thomas Dorr never married, but two of his sisters wed prominent men. One of his nephews married a daughter of John Lothrop Motley.

Background 
Dorr began his political career when elected as a representative in the Rhode Island General Assembly in 1834. He became concerned about issues of the franchise: white men who were not allowed to vote because they did not own a certain value of real estate, and the dominance of rural interests in the state legislature, where seats were apportioned by geographic jurisdictions, with all towns being treated as equal.

In the half-century following the American Revolution, some activists worked to expand the franchise, often by reducing property or similar requirements. In Rhode Island such attempts were made at intervals from 1797 to 1834, but had invariably been obstructed by the state government. In 1834 a convention met at the capital of Providence to consider the matter again. Dorr was a member of the committee which drew up an address to the people. All efforts at reform, however, were blocked again by the legislature, dominated by rural interests. Its apportionment resulted in an under-representation of the growing urban populations in the industrializing cities.

By 1841 Rhode Island was almost the only state that had not adopted universal suffrage for white males. It was the only state that did not adopt a new written constitution after the Revolution. It relied on its original 17th-century colonial charter. Under that document the original grantees had had the sole right to decide who should have a voice in the management of public affairs. As was customary at the time, they had decreed that land ownership, specifically of "a moderate landed estate," was required to vote.

By 1840 this requirement resulted in more than half the adult white male population being excluded from voting. Apportionment by geographic towns resulted in 19 seats, more than half of the legislature, being held by towns that had a total population of only 3,500 voters, when the state had a total of 108,000 residents, with many of them living in the larger cities.

Moreover, no person who did not own real estate could bring suit for recovery of debt or obtain redress for personal injury unless a freeholder endorsed his writ. Many residents had become landless with the onset of the Industrial Revolution, and the number of residents who did not own real estate was increasing with a wave of immigration from Ireland.

Suffrage referendum 

In 1840 the Rhode Island Suffrage Association was formed to address this increasingly unsatisfactory situation, and processions and popular meetings were held. State legislator Thomas Wilson Dorr took a leading part in the agitation.

The legislature refused to remedy the grievances, and the old charter did not provide any means for citizens to convene a constitutional convention. A "People's Party", therefore, was formed, which held a convention, adopted a constitution, and submitted it to a vote of the people. Approximately 14,000 ballots were cast in favor of it, and less than 100 cast against it. Of those in favor, more than 4,900 were qualified voters. The proposed state constitution was formally approved not only by the majority of the males over twenty-one but apparently by a majority of the voters considered legal under the charter.

The existing state government refused to consider any of these acts as legal.

Constitutional Convention called 
The legislature called a constitutional convention itself and submitted a new constitution to the people. The government's constitution was defeated by the narrow margin of 676 votes out of 16,702. This new constitution provided for most of what Dorr and his followers had been seeking, and historians believe their rejection of it was a tactical error. Feelings had become very bitter, and the Dorrites had already put their constitution into effect by electing an entire state ticket, with Dorr as governor.

Governor Thomas Wilson Dorr 
In May 1842 two governments in Rhode Island had held elections and were claiming the allegiance of the people. The People's Party did not attempt to seize the state house or machinery of government. Both governors issued proclamations, and Governor Samuel Ward King of the "Law and Order" party appealed to Washington, DC for Federal aid. Dorr went to Washington to plead his own cause before President John Tyler. There he received no encouragement, and he returned to Rhode Island.

Governor in exile 
Meanwhile, King had proclaimed martial law, offered a US$5,000 reward for the capture of Dorr, and made wholesale imprisonments of the latter's followers under the "Algerine Law." Many of Dorr's followers deserted him and he fled the state on May 18, 1842. A bungled attack on the Providence arsenal (which his father and younger brother, partisans of the "Law and Order" faction, were helping defend) led to the rebellion's disintegration.

Dorr returned briefly in June with a small band of New York volunteers, and assembled an armed force of his followers on Acote's Hill in Chepachet.  The governor ordered the state militia out, which marched on Chepachet.  Realizing that they would be defeated if they engaged the militia, Dorr's followers dispersed.  Dorr sought refuge in New Hampshire and Massachusetts.

Aftermath 
Dorr returned to Providence in October 1843, when he hoped the more liberal constitution that had been adopted would protect him, but he was arrested. King and the old government sought their revenge. Dorr was tried for treason against Rhode Island at Newport, a conservative stronghold, before the Rhode Island Supreme Court; he was convicted and sentenced to solitary confinement at hard labor for life. He was committed on June 27, 1844.

The public was outraged about this sentence, and in 1845 the legislature passed an Act of General Amnesty; Dorr was released after serving twelve months of his term. In 1851 his civil rights were restored. In January 1854 the legislature passed an act annulling the verdict of the supreme court, but the state court ruled this act was unconstitutional. Dorr's health had been broken by his ordeal, and after his release he lived in retirement until his death.

His work, however, bore fruit: in 1843 a third constitution had been drafted and ratified by the people that provided universal male suffrage. Today, Rhode Island's state government recognizes the legitimacy of Dorr's efforts and includes Dorr in its list of governors.

References

Further reading
 "Thomas Wilson Dorr". Dictionary of American Biography. American Council of Learned Societies, 1928–1936.
 Erik J. Chaput, The People's Martyr: Thomas Wilson Dorr and His 1842 Rhode Island Rebellion (University Press of Kansas, 2013)

External links

 The Dorr Rebellion Project at the Phillips Memorial Library, Providence College
 Strange Bedfellows: The Politics of Race in Antebellum Rhode Island
 The Letters of Thomas Wilson Dorr
Thomas Wilson Dorr daguerreotype from the Rhode Island State Archives

1805 births
1854 deaths
Politicians from Providence, Rhode Island
Phillips Exeter Academy alumni
Harvard College alumni
Governors of Rhode Island
Members of the Rhode Island House of Representatives
American prisoners sentenced to life imprisonment
Prisoners sentenced to life imprisonment by Rhode Island
People convicted of treason
Dorr Rebellion
Burials at Swan Point Cemetery
19th-century American politicians